Alison Fleming is a Canadian neuroscientist best known for her work studying mothering instincts and maternal behavior in a wide variety of models, including rats, mice, rabbits, monkeys, and humans. She is the University of Toronto Distinguished Professor of Psychology, 2012.  She was previously a professor in the Department of Psychology at the University of Toronto Mississauga.

Academic career 
Fleming received her B.Sc. from Columbia University in 1968.  She earned her Ph.D. in 1972 from Rutgers University under the mentorship of Jay S. Rosenblatt. Her dissertation research surrounded the effect of external factors on maternal behavior in rats. Fleming also later published an account of Rosenblatt's contributions to the field of maternal behavior relationships, entitled "The three faces of Jay S. Rosenblatt."

Fleming's work at St. Joseph's Hospital has involved using functional magnetic resonance imaging (fMRI) to study postpartum depression. Fleming has also studied how teenage mothers respond to their infants. As of March 2020, she  has published more than 170 journal articles.

Awards and recognitions 
 Elected member of the Royal Society of Canada, 2004
 D.G. Marquis Behavioral Neuroscience Award, 2004
 University of Toronto Faculty Research Excellence Award, 2005 
 Canadian Research Chair in Behavioral Neurobiology, 2005 
 University of Toronto Distinguished Professor of Psychology, 2012 
 Daniel S. Lehrman Life-Time Achievement Award, 2013

References 

Living people
Canadian neuroscientists
Canadian women neuroscientists
Academic staff of the University of Toronto
Academic staff of the University of Toronto Mississauga
Columbia University alumni
Rutgers University alumni
Year of birth missing (living people)
Place of birth missing (living people)